Creation Quarterly (创造季刊) was a Chinese literary quarterly magazine founded in 1921 and published between 1922 and 1924.

Publication history
The first issue of "Creation Quarterly" (创造季刊) debuted May 1, 1922 to a lively Beijing literary scene. Guo Moruo and his circle of friends founded the magazine near the end of 1921 in Tokyo. These young scholars were studying in Japan, soon to return to China.  Throughout the summer and fall, Guo Moruo collected manuscripts from his friends in Kyoto and Tokyo.

Key players were Guo, Cheng Fangwu, Yu Dafu and Zhang Ziping. They decried the poor translations and crude writings of the day. "Creation Quarterly" espoused the "new vernacular literature", emphasizing freedom of form, personal fulfillment, and individual style.  There is also a strain of romanticism harking back to 19th century English writers. Chinese society was changing rapidly with the younger generations embracing western ways.  The new vernacular writings found a ready audience.

Representative issue

Volume I, No 4, 1924 was the Shelley Memorial Issue.  In the special section on Shelley, there were two reviews by Guo Morou 郭沫若, Xu Zuzheng's 徐祖正 "Three English Romantic Poets", Zhang Dinghuang's 张定璜 "Shelley".

Creative works include a play and 10 poems by Guo; two short stories by Zhang Ziyping 张资平 "The Focus of Love" and "God's Children"; You Dafu's 郁达夫 "Picking Stone"; and Zhang Dinghuang's 张定璜 "On the Road"; Poems by He Wei 何畏 and Xu Zuzheng 徐祖正.

Reviews included "On Miss Bing Xin's Superman" and two others by Cheng Fangwu 成仿吾;

Miscellaneous included "Russian Literature Guide" translated by He Wei from Moissaye J.Olgin; "Chanson de fleur morte" translated by Wang Duqing 王独清; and 2 articles by Cheng Fangwu 成仿吾.

References 

  Feng, Liping (April 1996). "Democracy and Elitism: The May Fourth Ideal of Literature". Modern China (Sage Publications, Inc.) 22 (2): 170–196. . .

1922 establishments in China
1924 disestablishments in China
Literary magazines published in China
Defunct magazines published in China
Defunct literary magazines
Magazines established in 1922
Magazines disestablished in 1924
Magazines published in Beijing
Quarterly magazines
Chinese-language magazines